Virgiliu Pop (born in 1974) is a Romanian space lawyer and author. He has claimed ownership of the Sun in order to make a point about extraterrestrial property rights claims that he argues are bogus.
He has asserted that the Moon is a "commons", but also predicts that this status would not last if lunar exploitation were to become practical.

He works for the Romanian Space Agency and is publicly active in promoting space efforts in Romania.

List of works
 
 
 Avocatul Poporului – Institutie fundamentala a statului de drept: a book about the ombudsman institution 1995
 Orizont Interior: (No ISBN) a poetry book 1992

References

External links
 

1974 births
Romanian writers
Living people